Pardillo is a white Spanish wine grape planted primarily in western Spain. Varietal wines made from Pardillo are neutral flavored.

References

Spanish wine
Grape varieties of Spain
White wine grape varieties